Jordanhill Campus is an historic  estate within the boundaries of Jordanhill, Glasgow, Scotland, which developed as a country estate. It is best known and most recently used as the home to the Faculty of Education of the University of Strathclyde. Empty since 2012, after all previous educational activities were moved to the John Anderson Campus, the site which includes the Grade B listed David Stow building, is now up for sale with "minded to approve" planning permission for up to 364 new homes across 12 plots.

History

Jordanhill Estate:1546-1913

Crawfords of Jordanhill

In 1546 Lawrence Crawford of Kilbirnie founded a chaplainry at Drumry, and to sustain it endowed it with the freehold ownership of land at Jordanhill, which then accumulated rent at a rate of £5 per annum. His sixth son Thomas Crawford was a soldier who led the 1571 capture of Dumbarton Castle, who had previously acquired the lands at Jordanhill from the chaplain of Drumry in 1562. There he built a house, possibly on or close to the foundations of an original hunting lodge. In the 18th century, one of his descendants also called Lawrence Crawford extended and refurbished the old house, and laid out the original garden scheme and associated orchards.

Houstons of Jordanhill
In 1750 the Crawford family sold the estate to Tobacco Lords Alexander Houston, whose family was also forced to sell the estate in 1800 after his business got into trouble, to James Smith of merchants Smith & Leitch.

Smiths of Jordanhill

The third son of a Tobacco Lord from Craigend, James's two elder brothers having travelled to Virginia and North Carolina in the 1760s had noted the growing civil uprising warning of the forthcoming American War of Independence, and refocused their family's merchant business on trade with the West Indies. By the early 19th century, and after the death of their father, all three sons could afford to retire. As third son, James had no access to the family's landed estate, and so bought Jordanhill for £14,000 in 1800. He then spent a further £4,000 extending and modernising the manor house. By 1809, the estate was sustained by its four associated farms of Whiteinch, Windyedge, Woodend and Anniesland. Having married Mary Wilson that year (granddaughter of Alexander Wilson and niece of Patrick Wilson), Smith improved access to the main house by gravelling the road to the Anniesland toll road, which is now known as Crow Road. In 1821, with four children and a pregnant wife, after the purchase of Gartnavel farm he remodelled the existing house, and also built a stone pillar in direct line between his favourite window in the manor house library and the spire of Renfrew Parish Church. A keen leisure sailor, in 1827 Smith bought the Baths Hotel at Helensburgh. With seven children, after two of his daughters caught tuberculosis, the family relocated temporarily to Portugal and rented out the house for five years. After the death of both daughters, the family returned to the estate in 1846, but in 1847 Mrs. Smith died of pneumonia. Comfortable but with less of a fortune, Smith devoted his remaining twenty years to church works and supporting his children in their endeavours.

After the death of his father in 1866, his son Archibald Smith inherited the by now neglected Jordanhill estate. A qualified barrister who lived in London with his wife and three children, he devoted his spare time to working on the problems of the deviation of the navigational compass associated with the newly developed iron ships. In 1862 he published patents and papers to solve these, which brought him the Gold Medal of the Royal Society. Smith left most of the management of the estate to its staff, which generated £4,500 of income across its core  holding, of which £3,000 came from the quickly diminishing coal mines and ironstone workings leased on the former farmlands to the Monkland Iron and Steel Co. An 1872 government award of £2,000 for his compass research allowed him to replace the worst houses on the estate with new homes, today known as Compass Cottages in Anniesland Road. On his early death in 1872, to pay off death duties and the accrued debts of the estate, his wife sold of much of the estate's former farmlands for housing development north of the Glasgow, Yoker and Clydebank Railway.

After his mother's death in 1913, James Parker Smith inherited the estate. Educated at Winchester College and Trinity College, Cambridge, like his father he qualified as a barrister. After marriage to his cousin, he had devoted himself to politics, becoming Liberal Unionist MP for Glasgow Partick in 1890. In January 1900, Smith had been appointed assistant private secretary (unpaid) to Joseph Chamberlain, Secretary of State for the Colonies. After losing his seat in 1906, like his mother he began selling off more pieces of land four housing development, including the former Gartnavel farm to the Royal Lunatic Asylum. Approached by the university which was looking for a site on which to establish a unified teacher training college, in 1913 Parker Smith agreed sale of the residual estate.

Following the death of Archibald Colin Hamilton Smith in Australia on 5 June 1971, the sixth generation of the family who died without issue, the Smith family papers dealing with the Jordanhill Estate were donated to the Glasgow City Archives at the Mitchell Library. Many of the Smith family are buried in the graveyard surrounding Renfrew Parish Church.

On 25 June 2007, Lord Lyon King of Arms recognized Michael Babington Smith, the grandson of Archibald Colin Hamilton Smith as successor to his grandfather as Representer of the House of Smith of Jordanhill and therefore, Michael Babington Smith of Jordanhill.

Jordanhill College of Education:1913-2012

Dundas Vale Normal Seminary
In 1837, former merchant and educational pioneer David Stow had opened the Dundas Vale Normal Seminary, the first purpose-built institution in Europe for the training of teachers. Eight years later, following the Disruption of 1843 - the split between the Church of Scotland and the Free Church of Scotland - Stow led most of the staff and students out of Dundas Vale to found the rival Free Church Normal Seminary. For the rest of the century, Protestant teacher training in Glasgow was split between colleges run by the two church factions. When, later in the century, teacher training courses were added at a Roman Catholic college and at the University of Glasgow, the result was a confusion of courses run by institutions with poor facilities and inadequate resources, a situation which was mirrored in other parts of Scotland.

The Scottish Education Department (SED) therefore decided that teacher training could no longer be left to the churches but must become a national concern. Rather than administer this directly, in 1905 SED set up four Provincial Committees based on the notional provinces of the four "ancient universities" - Glasgow, Edinburgh, St Andrews and Aberdeen. These Provincial Committees operated within a tight framework of control by SED which provided the finances,  approved the courses and inspected the training centres. The Glasgow Provincial Committee held its first meeting in 1905, and from the start aimed to provide a new building in which all teacher training courses encompassing all religious beliefs could be taught.

Jordanhill Teacher Training College: 1913-1993
In 1913 Glasgow Corporation agreed a deal to buy the estate from the Smith family, and build both a teacher training college and the associated Jordanhill School on the site. After the outbreak of World War I, developments for the teacher training college were put on hold, as the former manor house was taken over as a temporary military hospital.

After the cessation of hostilities, a new building was planned to provide teacher training. With the new school completed in 1920 and the college in 1921, the now Grade B listed David Stow Building facilitated all teacher training provided under the unified University of Glasgow. Centrally funded and with no ties with churches, the college was largely non-residential (two small hostels were built, one in 1921 and the second in 1931); and its range of work was wider.

From 1921 to 1959 the regime at the college changed very little. SED authorised only a two-year course for primary teachers, and a one-year post-graduate course for secondary teachers. In addition the college provided in-service courses for qualified teachers. The only important changes both took place in 1931 when the two-year primary course was extended to three years (and limited exclusively to women), and the Scottish School of Physical Education (SSPE) was  created to train all the male PE teachers in Scotland.

In 1959, SED approved a Board of Governors and the right for each college to award their own qualifications. In part this was because of expected teacher shortages in the 1960s, with 1,927 students in 1959-60 the number grew to 2,813 in 1963–64, reaching a peak of 3,713 in 1975–76, making Jordanhill at that time the largest teacher training institution in Britain. This expansion far outstripped the capacity of the original 1921 Stow building and college (former manor house) building, and hence an extensive building programme which included the 1961 demolition of the original manor house had to be undertaken, to provide new accommodation (inter alia) for the SSPE and the School of Further Education. Part of the increase in student numbers was due to diversification. In 1964, the college began courses to train students for the youth and community service; in 1967 it began courses for social workers; in 1968 the Glasgow School of Speech Therapy moved to Jordanhill and became the Department of Speech Therapy; and in 1970 all the training of teachers for further education colleges in Scotland was centralised in a School of Further Education. In addition, in-service training expanded rapidly in response to the curriculum reform movements of the 1960s.

The period of expansion came to an abrupt end in 1976, when SED realised that there was an over supply of teachers. The smaller Hamilton College was closed in line with UK national policy, with most of its staff absorbed into Jordanhill. The 1980s brought about the degree level four year degree qualifications, and latterly accreditation under the Council for National Academic Awards (CNAA), with all students hence following degree or post-graduate diploma courses which were externally validated.

Faculty of Education, University of Strathclyde: 1993-2012
Anticipating the end of its independence, in 1991 the college approached the University of Glasgow with a proposal that it should become its Faculty of Education. In 1993, SED escalated the need for a merger with publication of its policy document on funding via the new Higher Education Funding Council. The University of Strathclyde approached the college, and an agreement between both institutions was reached. In 1993 Jordanhill College became the Faculty of Education of the University of Strathclyde.

With better use of facilities, and an ageing campus at Jordanhill which was highly protected by preservation orders, in 2010 the decision was made to close Jordanhill campus and move all courses to its John Anderson Campus. The academic year 2011-2012 was the last before this move took place.

The archives of Jordanhill College are maintained by the Archives of the University of Strathclyde.

Notable alumni
 Craig Brown, football player and manager including Scotland national team
 Tormod Caimbeul (1942–2015), Scottish Gaelic writer.
 Ray Fisher (1940–2011), Scottish folk singer
 Mairi Hedderwick, author and illustrator, creator of Katie Morag.
 Jackie Knight, cricketer and football player
 Gwyn Singleton (1933–2021), dyslexia education pioneer
 Gordon Smith, cricketer

Redevelopment
Working with Glasgow City Council and Historic Scotland to prepare a plan for the future of the former campus, in March 2015 the university announced a plan to sell the residual  estate via land agents JLL. The "minded-to-grant" planning permission in principle plans propose that:
Three-storey David Stow building could be converted for up to 71 residential apartments
Graham House and Douglas House could house up to 23 apartments each

The remaining 1960s buildings on the site are recommended for demolition, and then divided into 12 plots could be used to develop up to 364 further residential units.

See also
 Jordanhill RFC - the rugby club formed by the merger of Jordanhill College School FP RFC and Jordanhill College RFC in 1963.
 Hillhead Jordanhill RFC - the rugby club formed by the merger of Jordanhill RFC with Hillhead High School FP RFC in 1988.

References 

Marker W.B. (1994) The Spider's Web.  University of Strathclyde Publications Unit.
Harrison M M and Marker W B eds. (1996)  Teaching the Teachers : The History of Jordanhill College of Education.  John Donald,. Edinburgh.

External links
 Strathclyde School of Education

University of Strathclyde
College
Teacher training colleges in the United Kingdom